The Chengdu–Kunming railway or Chengkun railway, is a major trunkline railroad in southwestern China between Chengdu, the capital of Sichuan Province and Kunming, the capital of Yunnan Province. The line was built between 1958 and 1970. Major cities along route include Chengdu, Pengshan, Jiajiang, Emei, Ebian, Ganluo, Xide, Xichang, Dechang, Miyi and Panzhihua in Sichuan Province and Yuanmou, Lufeng, Anning and Kunming in Yunnan Province.

Construction of a largely new double-track line started in 2010 and is expected to be completed in 2023. A northern section of the old line is now called the Emei–Panzhihua railway (shortened to E-Pan railway) and a southern section is called the Yuanmou–Kunming railway (shortened to Yuankun railway).

History

Planning of the Chengdu–Kunming railway began in 1952 with several routes under consideration. An eastern route would have run via Neijiang, Zigong, Yibin, Shuifu, Yanjin. Yiliang, Malong and Songming. A central route would have taken a similar route as far as Yibin and continued via Pingshan, Suijiang, Yongshan, Daguan, Qiaojia, Huize, Dongchuan and Songming. A western route would run via Meishan, Leshan, Ebian Yi, Ganluo, Xide, Xichang, Dechang, Huili and Guangtong. Soviet advisers recommended the central route as they considered the western route to be too difficult to build, because of its geography and geology, and that it could not be maintained because it would be prone to flooding, mudslides and earthquakes. Nevertheless, a committee headed by Zhou Enlai preferred the western route and this was eventually confirmed. It was considered to give access to important mineral deposits, passed through areas inhabited by ethnic minorities and had advantages for national defence.
 
The eastern route was later used for much of the Neijiang–Kunming railway, which was completed in 2001. The central route has similarities to the route of the proposed high-speed line between Chengdu and Kunming.
 
Construction began in 1958 during the Great Leap Forward and expanded to full-scale in 1964. Work was accelerated due to the American bombing of North Vietnam after the passage of the Gulf of Tonkin Resolution. The only rail connection to Kunming at that time ran through North Vietnam. In July 1970, the line was completed and entered into operation in January 1971.  The government published a pictorial in 1976 showing pictures of the construction and extreme terrain that required hundreds of tunnels and bridges. Building conditions were hazardous and 2,100 workers perished during the construction of the original line.  On August 30, 2000, the entire line was electrified.  Aside from Chengdu and Kunming, the line has a total of 122 stations, although many of these are now closed for passengers and some for freight operations. Four stations on either side of the Jinsha River (Yangtze) crossing were inundated by the Wudongde Dam in 2020.

Sculpture

In 1974, an ivory sculpture commemorating the completion of the Chengdu–Kunming railway was presented as a gift to the United Nations and is displayed at the U.N. Headquarters in New York.  The sculpture depicts the rail bridge across the Dadu River between two mountain peaks, with intricate details of passengers inside the train.  The sculpture, 150 cm in length and 110 cm in height, was made from eight elephant tusks and weighs over 300 kilograms.

Railway junctions
The Chengkun railway is a major trunkline in China's railway network and connects with numerous other railway lines including:

Sichuan Province
 Chengdu: Baoji–Chengdu railway, Chengdu–Chongqing railway, Dazhou–Chengdu railway
Yunnan Province
 Guangtong: Guangtong–Dali railway
 Kunming: Shanghai–Kunming railway, Nanning–Kunming railway, Kunming–Yuxi railway

Natural Disaster Vulnerability
Four sections of the railroad which pass through the Niuri River Valley, Manshuiwan to Xichang of the Anning River Valley, Jinsha River Valley and Longchuan River Valley are under the exposure of the vulnerable debris flow and landslide. Soviet experts used to make a prediction that the railroad "will be turned into a pile of scrap iron by violent nature even after it is completed" in the route design stage; An Imagery Analysis Service Note published by CIA in October 1971 made a statement that "[the railroad] will undoubtedly require more than the normal maintenance because of the rugged terrain it passes through" based on the detected at least two replacement works of the destroyed tracks caused by landslides in the first year of its operation.

Upon operation, major natural disasters were not occurred in the Anning River Valley and Longchuan River Valley section due to the thoughtful route selection and complete protection strategies adopted. However, the Niuri River Valley that had a faster flow of the river - due to the short in length, steep channel, and unstable valley side slope - did not catch enough concerns in the construction period. Multiple incidents of debris flow have occurred in the Niuri River Valley section especially between Niri – Suxiong and Lianghong – Aidai.

Double-track project 
In the 21st century, with local economic growth, the single-track Chengdu-Kunming Railway has become congested. In order to create more capacity, the line is being replaced by a double track-line with longer tunnels and viaducts, although the original track has generally been retained as one of the two tracks between Chengdu and Emei. The Chengdu-Kunming railway double-track project is 900 kilometres long, with a design speed of 160 to 200 kilometres per hour, and a total investment of 55.2 billion yuan. Most of the new line runs near the old line, but on some sections of the route is significantly shortened and straightened. Therefore, the new line will be reduced by nearly 200 kilometres compared to the old 1091-kilometre line. After completion, it will only take about 7 hours from Chengdu to Kunming.

Work on the new line commenced in 2010. Double-tracking of the section between Hualongmen and Pengshan was completed in June 2017. The final 384 kilometre-long section between Emei and Miyi is due to be completed in 2023.

A northern section of the old line is now called the Emei–Panzhihua railway (shortened to E-Pan railway) and a southern section is called the Yuanmou–Kunming railway (shortened to Yuankun railway). The section of the old line between Huapengzi (south of Panzhihua) and Huangguayuan (north of Yuanmou) has been closed and flooded by the Wudongde Dam.

The new line will mainly handle freight. It is proposed that high-speed passenger services between Chengdu and Kunming will be provided by the Chengdu–Chongqing intercity railway (completed in 2015) from Chengdu to Neijiang North, the Southern Sichuan intercity railway (due to open in 2023) from Neijiang North to a new station in Yibin, and the Chongqing–Kunming high-speed railway (approved by the National Development and Reform Commission in 2019) from Yibin to Kunming.

See also

Daliang Mountains
 List of railways in China
 1981 Chengdu–Kunming rail crash

References

External links
 
 |CCTV-10 Documentary on the construction of the Chengkun railway

Railway lines in China
Rail transport in Sichuan
Rail transport in Yunnan
Railway lines opened in 1971